Clibanarius is a genus of hermit crabs in the family Diogenidae. Like other hermit crabs, their abdomen is soft-shelled and sheltered in a gastropod shell. Typically marine like all their relatives, the genus includes C. fonticola, the only known hermit crab species that spends all its life in freshwater. The feeding rates of Clibanarius spp. change with temperature which, given their broad distributions, may have considerable consequences for the stability reef systems as sea temperatures rise in the future.

They are omnivores, but mostly prey on small animals and scavenge carrion.

Species
As of 2009, about sixty species are recognized in Clibanarius; new species are discovered and described occasionally. Others have been placed here at one time or another but are now assigned to other genera of Diogenidae, namely Bathynarius, Calcinus, Paguristes, Strigopagurus and Trizopagurus.

The Clibanarius species are:

Clibanarius aequabilis (Dana, 1851)
Clibanarius africanus Aurivillus, 1898
Clibanarius albidigitus Nobili, 1901
Clibanarius ambonensis Rahayu & Forest, 1993
Clibanarius antennatus Rahayu & Forest, 1993
Clibanarius antillensis Stimpson, 1859
Clibanarius arethusa De Man, 1888
Clibanarius astathes (Stebbing, 1924)
Clibanarius bimaculatus De Haan, 1849
Clibanarius bistriatus Rahayu & Forest, 1993
Clibanarius boschmai Buitendijk, 1937
Clibanarius carnifex Heller, 1861
Clibanarius chapini Schmitt, 1926
Clibanarius clibanarius (Herbst, 1791)
Clibanarius cooki Rathbun, 1900
Clibanarius corallinus (H. Milne-Edwards, 1848)
Clibanarius cruentatus (H. Milne-Edwards, 1848)
Clibanarius danai Rahayu & Forest, 1993
Clibanarius demani Buitendijk, 1937
Clibanarius digueti Bouvier, 1898
Clibanarius englaucus Ball & Haig, 1972
Clibanarius erythropus (Latreille, 1818)
Clibanarius eurysternus (Hilgendorf, 1879)
Clibanarius fonticola McLaughlin & Murray, 1990
Clibanarius foresti Holthuis, 1959
Clibanarius harisi Rahayu, 2003
Clibanarius hirsutimanus Kobjakova, 1971
Clibanarius humilis (Dana, 1851)
Clibanarius inaequalis (De Haan, 1849)
Clibanarius infraspinatus (Hilgendorf, 1869)
Clibanarius janethaigae Hendrickx & Esparza-Haro, 1997
Clibanarius laevimanus Buitendijk, 1937
Clibanarius lineatus (H. Milne-Edwards, 1848)
Clibanarius longitarsus (De Haan, 1849)
Clibanarius merguiensis De Man, 1888
Clibanarius multipunctatus Wang & Tung, 1986
Clibanarius nathi Chopra & Das, 1940
Clibanarius olivaceus Henderson, 1915
Clibanarius pacificus Stimpson, 1858
Clibanarius padavensis De Man, 1888
Clibanarius ransoni Forest, 1953
Clibanarius rhabdodactylus Forest, 1953
Clibanarius rosewateri Manning & Chace, 1990
Clibanarius rubroviria Rahayu, 1999
Clibanarius rutilus Rahayu, 1999
Clibanarius sachalinicus Kobjakova, 1955
Clibanarius sclopetarius (Herbst, 1796)
Clibanarius senegalensis Chevreux & Bouvier, 1892
Clibanarius serenei Rahayu & Forest, 1993
Clibanarius signatus Heller, 1861
Clibanarius similis Rahayu & Forest, 1993
Clibanarius snelliusi Buitendijk, 1937
Clibanarius striolatus Dana, 1852
Clibanarius taeniatus (H. Milne-Edwards, 1848)
Clibanarius tricolor (Gibbes, 1850)
Clibanarius virescens (Krauss, 1843)
Clibanarius vittatus (Bosc, 1802)
Clibanarius willeyi Southwell, 1910
Clibanarius zebra Dana, 1852

Clibanarius elongatus (H. Milne Edwards, 1848) is a nomen dubium.

References

Diogenidae
Taxa named by James Dwight Dana
Decapod genera